Yoo Il (born Park Sang-il on January 11, 1990) is a South Korean actor. In 2009, he made his debut as a former cast member of variety show . He was a member and the leader of Fantagio's actor group 5urprise from 2013 until their disbanding on 2020.

Personal life 
In June 2022, it was reported that Yoo will marry actress Joo Min-ha, who have been together for four years, with a wedding ceremony in July 2022 that will be held in a private ceremony. His wife gave birth to their first child, a son, on December 24, 2022.

Filmography

Television series

Web series

Variety show

Theater

Musical

References

External links
 on Fantagio 

1990 births
Living people
Male actors from Seoul
South Korean male television actors
South Korean male idols
South Korean male stage actors
South Korean male musical theatre actors
South Korean television personalities
21st-century South Korean male actors